The Citizens' Forces is a political party in Morocco.

History and profile
The party was founded in November 2001. The founder is Abderrahim Lahyuyi.

In the parliamentary election held on 27 September 2002, the party won 2 out of 325 seats. At the turning of 2005, it went into an alliance with the PJD.

In the parliamentary election held on 7 September 2007, the party won 1 out of 325 seats.

References

2001 establishments in Morocco
Political parties established in 2001
Political parties in Morocco